Erdem Moralıoğlu  (born November 1977) is a British fashion designer.

Early life and education
Moralıoğlu was born in Montreal, Quebec, Canada to a Turkish father and an English mother (nee Jeavons), and grew up between Montreal and Birmingham, England.

A graduate of Marianopolis College, Moralıoğlu earned a BA in fashion from Ryerson Polytechnical Institute in Toronto, Canada and then worked as an intern for Vivienne Westwood. He moved to London in 2000 to study fashion at the Royal College of Art on a Chevening Scholarship.

Career
Moralıoğlu moved to New York before relocating back to London to launch his own label, ERDEM, in 2005.

In 2017, ERDEM collaborated with H&M, Moralıoğlu’s first collection for men; director Baz Luhrmann created the visuals for the campaign.

In 2018, Moralıoğlu designed costumes for 24 ballet dancers performing in Christopher Wheeldon's Corybantic Games at the Royal Opera House in London.

In 2021, ERDEM expanded to designing menswear.

Recognition
In 2014, Moralıoğlu was named the British Fashion Council’s Women’s Wear Designer of the Year. In 2017, he won International Canadian Designer of the Year at the Canadian Arts & Fashion Awards.

Moralıoğlu was appointed Member of the Order of the British Empire (MBE) in the 2020 Birthday Honours for services to fashion.

Personal life
Moralıoğlu lives and operates a studio in Bethnal Green, east London. He has a twin sister, Sara, who makes TV documentaries about geography and natural history. Since 2018, he has been married to architect Philip Joseph.

References

External links
Official website

Living people
Alumni of the Royal College of Art
Canadian fashion designers
Canadian people of English descent
Canadian people of Turkish descent
Toronto Metropolitan University alumni
People from Montreal
Canadian emigrants to the United Kingdom
British fashion designers
Members of the Order of the British Empire
1977 births
Chevening Scholars
LGBT fashion designers
Canadian twins